The Cray Urika-GD graph discovery appliance is a computer application that finds and analyzes relationships and patterns in the data collected by a supercomputer. 

Introduced in 2012 by Cray Inc., it was the company's maker's first product to produce meaningful graphs based on large amounts of data, often from multiple sources, and to make useful connections among those data.  Many organizations now have vast stores of information like this—called "big data"—that they can analyze and use to improve their operations, products or services.

One example of the appliance in use would be a healthcare organization that helps to find, among its 13 million patient records, information that doctors could use to develop treatment plans. Graphing the records of existing patients by categories such as illness, age, treatment and outcome may provide guidance on treating another patient.  

Big data is also being tapped in professional sports. In 2014, Cray revealed that a Major League Baseball team was using a Urika-GD appliance to graph and analyze its own performance statistics.

References

External links
"Global Supercomputer Leader Cray Inc. Awarded $80 million by King Abdullah University of Science and Technology (KAUST)." Dataconomy. 18 November 2014.
"The Evolution of Data Analytics." Infographic.
Eileen McNulty (22 May 2014). "Understanding Big Data: The Seven V's." Dataconomy.

Cray products